Big Little Lies is an American drama television series based on the 2014 novel of the same name by Liane Moriarty. Created and written by David E. Kelley, it aired on HBO from February 19, 2017, to July 21, 2019, encompassing 14 episodes and two seasons. Originally billed as a miniseries, Jean-Marc Vallée directed the first season, while Andrea Arnold directed the second season.

Big Little Lies stars Reese Witherspoon, Nicole Kidman, Shailene Woodley, Laura Dern, and Zoë Kravitz as five women in Monterey, California, who become embroiled in a murder investigation. Alexander Skarsgård, Adam Scott, James Tupper and Jeffrey Nordling also feature in supporting roles. For the second season, Meryl Streep joined the main cast while Kathryn Newton and Iain Armitage were upgraded following their appearances in recurring capacities.

The series has received critical acclaim, particularly for its writing, directing, acting, production values, cinematography and soundtrack. The first season received 16 Primetime Emmy Award nominations and won eight, including Outstanding Limited Series, a directing award for Vallée, and acting awards for Kidman, Skarsgård, and Dern. The trio also won Golden Globe Awards in addition to a Best Miniseries or Television Film win for the series. Kidman and Skarsgård also received Screen Actors Guild Awards for their performances.

Cast and characters

Main

 Reese Witherspoon as Madeline Martha Mackenzie
 Nicole Kidman as Celeste Wright
 Shailene Woodley as Jane Chapman
 Alexander Skarsgård as Perry Wright, Celeste's husband
 Adam Scott as Ed Mackenzie, Madeline's husband
 Zoë Kravitz as Bonnie Howard Carlson, Nathan's wife
 James Tupper as Nathan Carlson, Madeline's ex-husband and Bonnie's husband
Jeffrey Nordling as Gordon Klein, Renata's husband
 Laura Dern as Renata Klein
 Iain Armitage as Ziggy Chapman, Jane's son
 Sarah Baker as Thea Cunningham (season 1)
 Sarah Burns as Gabrielle (season 1)
 P. J. Byrne as Warren Nippal, the principal of Otter Bay Elementary
 Santiago Cabrera as Joseph Bachman, a theater director (season 1; recurring season 2)
 Darby Camp as Chloe Adaline Mackenzie, Madeline and Ed's daughter
 Gia Carides as Melissa (season 1; recurring season 2)
 Hong Chau as Jackie (season 1)
 Kelen Coleman as Harper Stimson (season 1; recurring season 2)
 Joseph Cross as Tom, Madeline and Celeste's favorite café owner (season 1)
 Merrin Dungey as Detective Adrienne Quinlan
 Ivy George as Amabella Klein, Renata and Gordon's daughter
 Virginia Kull as Ms. Barnes, the children's elementary-school teacher (season 1)
 Kathryn Newton as Abigail Carlson, Madeline and Nathan's daughter
 Sarah Sokolovic as Tori Bachman, Joseph's wife
 Robin Weigert as Dr. Amanda Reisman, Perry and Celeste's therapist
 Molly Hagan as Dr. Moriarty, Ziggy's child psychologist (season 1)
 Patrick St. Esprit as Mayor Bartley (season 1)
 Annie Fitzgerald as Tracy Rensing (season 1)
 Meryl Streep as Mary Louise Wright, Perry's mother (season 2)
 Cameron Crovetti as Josh Wright, Celeste and Perry's son (season 2; recurring season 1)
 Nicholas Crovetti as Max Wright, Celeste and Perry's son (season 2; recurring season 1)
 Mo McRae as Michael Perkins, a new second-grade teacher at Otter Bay Elementary (season 2)
 Douglas Smith as Corey Brockfield, Jane's love interest and co-worker at Monterey Bay Aquarium (season 2)
 Martin Donovan as Martin Howard, Bonnie's father (season 2)
 Crystal R. Fox as Elizabeth Howard, Bonnie's mother (season 2)
 Denis O'Hare as Ira Farber, Mary Louise's lawyer (season 2)
 Becky Ann Baker as Marylin Cipriani, the judge in Celeste and Mary Louise's custody case (season 2)
 Poorna Jagannathan as Katie Richmond, Celeste's lawyer (season 2)

Recurring

 Chloe Coleman as Skye Carlson, Bonnie and Nathan's daughter
 Larry Sullivan as Oren
 Larry Bates as Stu
 Kathreen Khavari as Samantha (season 1)
 David Monahan as Bernard (season 1)

Episodes

Season 1 (2017)

Season 2 (2019)

Production

Development
Actresses and producers Nicole Kidman and Reese Witherspoon were announced to have optioned the screen rights to Liane Moriarty's novel Big Little Lies on August 6, 2014, less than a month after the book's publication. The two of them were expected to develop the project as a film in which they would star and act as executive producers, sharing the latter duty with Bruna Papandrea and Per Saari; Moriarty was also expected to produce. In November of that year, the actresses announced the format's shift into that of a limited-run television series written by David E. Kelley. In May 2015, HBO gave the series a production order and Kelley was announced to join the team of executive producers. That October, Jean-Marc Vallée was reportedly in talks with the project's team to handle directing of the first episode and potentially others. His involvement with all seven episodes was confirmed almost two months later. The series' release date of February 19, 2017, was unveiled in November 2016.

Originally conceived and billed as a miniseries, a potential new season of Big Little Lies was discussed by the series' audience and the media. In July 2017, two weeks after the project and its cast and crew received several nominations for the 69th ceremony of the Primetime Emmy Awards, Witherspoon stated: "As of right now, I think it's pretty whole. I feel really good about where it is, and if this is all it ever was, it's a beautiful thing we all accomplished together". However, in the wake of the nominations, HBO revealed that a second season was possible, and that Moriarty had been asked to write a story for it. During a April 2017 interview, Vallée came out strongly against the idea of producing a second season: "There's no reason to make a season two. That was meant to be a one-time deal, and it's finishing in a way where it's for the audience to imagine what can happen. If we do a season two, we'll break that beautiful thing and spoil it." When he and the series won several accolades at the 69th ceremony of the Primetime Emmy Awards, the director changed his mind: "It'd be great to reunite the team and to do it. Are we going to be able to do it, altogether? I wish."

In December 2017, HBO officially renewed the series for a seven-episode second season to be written by Kelley, directed by Andrea Arnold, based on a new novella by Moriarty, and with Vallée remaining an executive producer. The announcement of the second season, and specifically its timing, enraged producers of rival shows that were competing for award nominations in the limited series categories, particularly since it was made after voting for the Critics' Choice Television Award and Golden Globe Award were over. Due to this, the Producers Guild of America restarted voting for the 2018 ceremony of their award show, reclassifying the show from a limited series to a drama series. The second season premiered on June 9, 2019.

Controversy
In July 2019, it was reported by IndieWire that director Andrea Arnold lost creative control after filming had completed, and it was given to season 1 director Jean-Marc Vallée in an attempt to unify the style between the seasons. Arnold was initially promised by HBO that the show would be done in her vision, including post-production, and was unaware that Vallée would edit the footage she had shot. Once Vallée completed his work on Sharp Objects, he took over the editing process along with his own editorial team in Montreal. HBO also ordered 17 more days of additional photography, to be filmed by Arnold, but overseen by Vallée. Significant reworking of the episodes also took place, where episodes were shortened. In response, HBO programming president Casey Bloys stated, "There's a lot of misinformation around that subject" and "the director typically does not have final creative control". Bloys clarified that Vallée came back to "hone the episodes" after being asked by the entire producing team, including Reese Witherspoon and Nicole Kidman, and that they were clear with Arnold about how the process would work from the start.

Casting

Alongside the initial announcement of the production's development, Kidman and Witherspoon were reported to also star in the adaptation. In December 2015, Shailene Woodley, Adam Scott, Laura Dern, and Zoë Kravitz were announced to have been cast in lead roles, with Kathryn Newton in a recurring one. The following month, Alexander Skarsgård, James Tupper, and Jeffrey Nordling joined the starring cast, while Santiago Cabrera, P. J. Byrne, Kelen Coleman, Sarah Burns, Darby Camp, Cameron and Nicholas Crovetti, Ivy George, Chloe Coleman, Virginia Kull, Sarah Baker, Kathreen Khavari, Larry Bates, Hong Chau, Gia Carides, Merrin Dungey, Larry Sullivan, David Monahan, and Iain Armitage landed supporting roles. The latter one was cast in the role of Woodley's character's son.

Following the confirmation of a sophomore season, Meryl Streep was announced in January 2018 to have joined the starring cast in the role of Skarsgård's character's mother. In February, Woodley, Dern, Kravitz, Scott, Tupper, Nordling and Armitage were confirmed to be returning. That March, Douglas Smith was cast in a recurring role. In April, it was reported that Crystal Fox joined the main cast alongside returners Newton and Sokolovic, while Mo McRae and Martin Donovan joined the recurring cast alongside returners Weigert and Dungey. However, only Newton received main billing; Fox and Sokolovic's appearances were credited as recurring. Byrne was announced alongside newcomer Poorna Jagannathan in May, followed by Denis O'Hare in June.

Filming
For the first season, Vallée shot the series with an Arri Alexa digital camera and preferred using natural lighting and handheld shooting style to allow actors to move freely around the set. Several scenes were filmed on location in the Monterey Peninsula, Big Sur, Pacific Grove, and Carmel Highlands.

Soundtrack
ABKCO Records released soundtracks for the first and second seasons on March 31, 2017, and July 19, 2019, respectively.

Release

Broadcast
On February 7, 2017, the series held its official premiere at the TCL Chinese Theatre in Los Angeles, California. Internationally, the series premiered on February 20, 2017, in Australia on Showcase, and on March 13, 2017, in the United Kingdom and Ireland on Sky Atlantic.

Marketing
On October 16, 2016, HBO released the first teaser trailer for the series. On December 5, 2016, HBO released a full length trailer for the series.

Home media
The first season was released on Blu-ray and DVD on August 1, 2017. The second season was released on January 7, 2020, on DVD and manufacture-on-demand Blu-ray by Warner Home Entertainment and Warner Archive Collection respectively.

Reception

Critical response

On the review aggregation website Rotten Tomatoes, the first season holds a 93% "certified fresh" rating with an average rating of 8 out of 10 based on 199 reviews. The website's critical consensus reads, "Bitingly funny and highly addictive, Big Little Lies is a twisty, thrilling, enlightening ride led by a first-rate cast." Metacritic, which uses a weighted average, assigned the first season a score of 75 out of 100, based on 42 critics, indicating "generally favorable reviews". Time magazine listed Big Little Lies as one of its top ten television shows of 2017.

On Rotten Tomatoes, the second season holds an 86% "certified fresh" rating with an average rating of 7.7 out of 10 based on 265 reviews. The website's critical consensus reads, "Gorgeous and gripping, Big Little Lies second season doubles down on the dark humor and gives its impressive cast even more juicy drama to chew on – especially an excellent Meryl Streep." On Metacritic, the season has a score of 82 out of 100, based on 36 critics, indicating "universal acclaim". Ben Travers of IndieWire wrote a positive review giving it a "B+" grade, concluding that Season 2 is a "wholly different beast" and "doesn’t feel like a necessary addition so much as an enjoyable epilogue", yet it is "still very, very good".

Ratings

Season 1

Season 2

Accolades

Future 
HBO president Casey Bloys said a third season of the show was "not realistic" due to scheduling the show's actors, but mentioned that the network is more than willing to greenlight it if the cast is able to work out their schedules. In October 2020, Nicole Kidman revealed during a press interview for The Undoing that author Liane Moriarty is writing the plot for a potential third season and that the cast and crew are excited to reunite for it. In a November 2022 interview with GQ, Zoë Kravitz confirmed the series would not return for a third season because of the death of director Jean-Marc Vallée.

Notes

References

External links

2010s American drama television series
2010s American mystery television series
2017 American television series debuts
2019 American television series endings
Adultery in television
Best Miniseries or Television Movie Golden Globe winners
Domestic violence in television
English-language television shows
HBO original programming
Monterey, California
Nonlinear narrative television series
Primetime Emmy Award for Outstanding Miniseries winners
Primetime Emmy Award-winning television series
Rape in television
Television controversies in the United States
Television shows based on Australian novels
Television series by Home Box Office
Television series created by David E. Kelley
Television shows filmed in California
Television shows set in California
Infidelity in television